Rakshasa Rajavu is a 2001 Indian Malayalam-language action crime film written and directed by Vinayan and starring Mammootty in the lead role along with Dileep, Meena, Kalabhavan Mani, Vijayakumar, Rajan P. Dev, Cochin Haneefa and Sukumari. The film was released on 31 August 2001, and was subsequently dubbed in Telugu and Tamil as Commissioner Rudrama Naidu and Commissioner Eeswara Paandiyan.

Plot
Ramanathan IPS is a police officer with a difference. The murder of his wife makes him take the law into his own hands as he gets no support from the various people he meets in this regard. He is always assisted by his subordinate SP Gopakumar IPS who admires Ramanathan for his honest and truthful behavior. He brings to justice the wrong doer's even though he accepts bribes. He follows the policy of Kayamkulam Kochunni a renowned real-life robber: taking from the rich and giving it to the poor. He also funds to run an orphanage for the mentally disabled children.

Appu is in love with Daisy the daughter of a wealthy politician. Daisy is under house arrest when her love comes to the knowledge of her rich father. Appu manages to meet her secretly. One day Daisy's whole family is slaughtered as a result of a burglary. She is the only person found alive & is now in a coma. Appu is accused of the murder & arrested. The rest of the story explains how Ramanathan saves Appu by proving his innocence & reveals the person who killed all of Daisy's family members for money & power.

Cast

Release
The film was released on 31 August 2001. The film was the second release of director Vinayan after Karumadikkuttan which was released in April 2001.

Box office
The film was commercial success and ran over 100 days in theatres.

Soundtrack

References

External links
 

2000s Malayalam-language films
Fictional portrayals of police departments in India
Fictional portrayals of the Kerala Police
Indian crime action films
2000s masala films
Films directed by Vinayan
Films scored by Mohan Sithara
2001 action films
2001 films